Arnot St Mary Primary School is a Church of England primary school situated in the Walton area of Liverpool, England. The building is listed at Grade II by Historic England. The site was formerly Arnot Community Primary School; however, as a result of the school merging with Walton St Mary Church of England Primary, the site re-opened in 2008 as Arnot St Mary Primary School.

History
Formerly a Board School (1883–91), where elementary education could be provided independent of the Church of England, it was the principal site of the Walton Board. It subsequently became Walton St Mary Church of England Primary School. That school was notable for being that which Jon Venables and Robert Thompson, (the young murderers of James Bulger) attended. The school merged with the local Arnot Street Community Primary School in September 2008. While the building work on the Arnot Site took place, most classes were taught on the Walton St Mary site. The work finished and the school became Arnot St Mary Church of England Primary School in September 2010.

Building
The architect was Edmund Kirby, with construction by Joshua Henshaw and Sons of Liverpool.

References

External links

Liverpool Council listing

Church of England primary schools in the Diocese of Liverpool
Primary schools in Liverpool
Voluntary controlled schools in England
Educational institutions established in 1883
1883 establishments in England
Grade II listed buildings in Liverpool